City of Clinton was a small steam ferry built in 1922 which served on Puget Sound until March 23, 1929, when the vessel caught fire and sank near the city of Mukilteo, Washington, USA.

Career
City Of Clinton was built at Clinton, Washington, and was intended to run between that city and Everett, Washington. King County at that time owned and operated a number of ferries. King County ferries running between Seattle and Vashon Island, including City of Clinton, were turned over for operation and management to the Kitsap County Transportation Company.

On March 23, 1929, the ferry caught fire while underway near Mukilteo and sank.

Notes

References 
 Kline, M.S., and Bayless, G.A., Ferryboats -- A legend on Puget Sound, Bayless Books, Seattle, WA 1983 
 Newell, Gordon R., ed., H.W. McCurdy Marine History of the Pacific Northwest,  Superior Publishing Co., Seattle, WA (1966)

1922 ships
Steamboats of Washington (state)
Steam ferries of Washington (state)
Ships built in Washington (state)
Kitsap County Transportation Company